The Kamov Ka-20 (NATO reporting name Harp) was a Soviet twin-engined prototype helicopter designed and built by Kamov that led to the Ka-25 family of helicopters, it was developed, during the rise of the cold war to counter American Naval Offensives.

Design and development
Developed from the earlier Ka-15 to meet a 1958 Soviet Navy requirement for a heavy shipborne helicopter, the Ka-20 had the similar twin contra-rotating, three-blade rotors of the earlier Ka-15 design and was powered by two 670 kW turboshaft engines. The Ka-20 was built to demonstrate the feasibility of mounting the turboshaft engines above the cabin and it had no mission equipment or corrosion protection although it was fitted with a nose-mounted radome.

The Ka-20 first became known outside the Soviet Union at the 1961 Tushino Aviation Day display where a Ka-20 was demonstrated fitted with dummy missiles on the cabin sides. The design was developed as the Ka-25 anti-submarine helicopter, it's Soviet Naval Air Force code name was assigned the "Hormone".

See also

External links
 Kamov N.I.

Ka-20
1960s Soviet anti-submarine aircraft
Military helicopters
Coaxial rotor helicopters
1960s Soviet helicopters